Love Like the Falling Rain is a 2020 Indonesian teen romantic drama film directed by Lasja Fauzia; written by Upi Avianto, Boy Candra, and Piu Syarif; starring Jefri Nichol, Aurora Ribero, and Axel Matthew Thomas.

Cast
 Jefri Nichol as Kevin
 Aurora Ribero as Nara Senja
 Axel Matthew Thomas as Juned
 Nadya Arina as Tiara
 Karina Suwandhi as Juned's Mother
 Rebecca Klopper as Rina
 Aida Nurmala as Kevin's Mother
 Pascal Azhar as Kevin's Father
 Tina Astari as Nara's Mother
 Indra Aksa as Nara's Father
 Harris Soedarto as Farid
 Jauhar Robert as Boni
 Gerald Abdullah as Firman
 Richard Oh
 Kelly Tandiono

References

External links
 
 

2020 films
Indonesian-language Netflix original films
Indonesian coming-of-age drama films
2020s coming-of-age drama films
Indonesian teen drama films
Indonesian romantic drama films
2020s teen drama films
2020 romantic drama films
Films with screenplays by Upi Avianto
Films with screenplays by Boy Candra
Films with screenplays by Piu Syarif
Films directed by Lasja Fauzia Susatyo
Films not released in theaters due to the COVID-19 pandemic
Indonesian teen romance films
2020s Indonesian-language films